The 1978 Australian Rally Championship was a series of six rallying events held across Australia. It was the eleventh season in the history of the competition.

Greg Carr and navigator Fred Gocentas in the Ford Escort RS1800 won the 1978 Championship, finally breaking the dominance of the Datsuns for the past three years.

Season review

The eleventh Australian Rally Championship was held over six events across Australia, the season consisting of two events for New South Wales and one event each for Victoria, Queensland, South Australia and Western Australia.  The 1978 season was again a closely fought battle which resulted in a tie at the finish of the last event of the season between the Datsun of Dunkerton and the Escort of Carr.  However the championship was awarded to Carr on a countback as he had three wins to Dunkerton's one.

The Rallies

The six events of the 1978 season were as follows.

Round Four – Bega Valley Rally

1978 Drivers and Navigators Championships
Final pointscore for 1978 is as follows.

Greg Carr – Champion Driver 1978

John Dawson-Damer – Champion Navigator 1978

References

External links
  Results of Snowy Mountains Rally and ARC results.

Rally Championship
Rally competitions in Australia
1978 in rallying